Altay is a Turkish modern main battle tank based on South Korean K2 Black Panther to be produced by BMC under design assistance and technology transfer by Hyundai Rotem. It is named in honor of Army General Fahrettin Altay who commanded the 5th Cavalry Corps in the final stage of the Turkish War of Independence. It is one of the most expensive tank designs with a unit cost of 13.75 million dollars. The first mass production of Altay will be combined with MKE made 55 calibre 120 mm main gun, Roketsan made advanced armor package along with Aselsan made active protection system, and Hyundai Doosan Infracore engine and SNT Dynamics transmission.

History and development
The National Tank Production Project (Turkish: MİTÜP – Milli Tank Üretimi Projesi) was an initiative developed in the mid-1990s to establish independent and robust infrastructure for the production, development and maintenance of main battle tanks used by the Turkish Armed Forces. In order to improve the current technical capabilities of the Turkish defense industries and increase the amount of domestic contribution towards national defense, the Undersecreteriat for Defense Industries decided that a "National Tank" will serve as a catalyst for uniting certain Turkish defense companies around a common goal and for providing the Turkish military with extra firepower in the form of a modern tank.

The tank design benefited from design assistance and transfer of technology by Hyundai Rotem. The project was initiated with an agreement signed between Otokar and the Undersecretariat for Defense Industries of the Republic of Turkey on 30 March 2007, when the Defense Industries Executive Committee awarded a contract worth approximately $500 million to Otokar for the design, development and production of four prototypes of a national main battle tank. On July 29, 2008, Turkey and Hyundai Rotem signed a ₩500 billion (approximately US$540 million) design assistance and technology transfer contract for tank development. This contract consists of design assistance and technology transfer related to the development of systems, armor packages, and 120 mm guns necessary for the development of Altay tanks, and includes design assistance and technology transfer of Hyundai Rotem, Hyundai WIA, and Agency for Defense Development throughout the development process. The Turkish Ministry of Defense allocated a budget of $1 billion for the development of the Altay. This is Turkey's first MBT development program since 1943, when prototypes of a Turkish national tank were produced in Kırıkkale, but 1943's program never reached full-scale mass production.

The first 3D image of the MBT was released to the public on 7 April 2010 during a press release by the Undersecreteriat for Defense Industries of the Republic of Turkey. In 2012, Otokar General Manager Serdar Görgüç has announced that the company is considering the development of an electric engine for the Altay. However, the electric engine probably no longer in consideration. The military electronics company ASELSAN manufactures and integrates the Volkan III modular fire control system, command, control and information systems, while state-owned MKEK (Mechanical and Chemical Industries Corporation) produce MKE 120 mm tank gun. Another state company ROKETSAN produce an indigenous armor. The first prototype Altay was ready for use by the end of 2016. Once the prototypes are produced and tested, the Undersecreteriat for Defense Industries of the Republic of Turkey will prepare and execute a separate order for the first lot of 250 tanks. A total of 1000 MBTs are planned to be produced in four separate lots of 250 units. Every delivered lot is expected to have additional upgrades. Otokar completed all infrastructure planning and programming for mass production. Koç Holding Vice Chair and Otokar Chair Ali Koç said mass production was expected to start 18–22 months after their offer was accepted.

However, on 9 November 2018, Turkish Presidency of Defense Industries signed agreement with BMC for mass production of the tank. In the process, BMC replaced Otokar as the main contractor and responsible for further developments.

The production of Altay has been delayed since 2018, as the programme was relying on German 1,500 hp MTU engines and RENK transmissions, because of the German federal arms embargo on Turkey due to their involvement in the Syrian Civil War.

However, BMC Power, a subsidiary of BMC, replaced MTU as engine subcontractor for 1,500 hp engine. BMC Power is the designer and manufacturer of the serial production BATU V12 1,500 hp engine.

On 10 March 2021, BMC announced that it plans to import a Korean power pack that combines Doosan Infracore (now Hyundai Doosan Infracore) DV27K engine and SNT Dynamics EST15K transmission and complete the performance test of the Altay tank according to Turkey's own standards as soon as possible.

On 11 August 2021, the South Korean Defense Acquisition Program Administration announced that it was looking for a Korean company to develop an improved SNT Dynamics EST15K transmission for use in Altay and K2 Black Panther.

On 7 October 2021, the South Korean Defense Acquisition Program Administration announced that it is looking for a Korean company to develop an indigenous Transmission control unit to replace the German Transmission control unit used in the SNT Dynamics EST15K transmission to export transmissions to Turkey.

On 22 October 2021, Kang Eun-ho, head of South Korea's Defense Acquisition Program Administration, said he had approved the export of Hyundai Doosan Infracore DV27K engines and SNT Dynamics EST15K transmissions to Turkey during a meeting with Turkish Foreign Minister Mevlüt Çavuşoğlu visiting South Korea.

At the Antalya Diplomacy Forum held on March 11, 2022, Dr. Ismail Demir, president of Turkish Defense Industries (SSB), revealed that he was testing Hyundai Doosan Infracore DV27K engine and SNT Dynamics EST15K transmission imported from South Korea and he said in May that he will be able to see a prototype of Altay that combines Korean engines and transmissions.

In August 2022, the durability test of the powerpack combined with the DV27K engine and EST15K transmission imported from South Korea is underway, and if the durability test succeeds, the first 250 Altay will be produced by integrating the Korean powerpack.

In his speech at the handover ceremony of the new generation of assault howitzers (MSB Arifiye Campus BMC Plant / Sakarya), President Erdogan said that two new altay tanks will be manufactured in 2023.

On 30 January 2023, BMC signed a supply agreement with SNT Dynamics to purchase the EST15K transmission. The agreement includes a supply contract (approximately €68.926 million) to procure 90 transmissions by December 2027 and an option contract (approximately €130,900 million) to procure an additional 150 transmissions by December 2030.

Contractors and subcontractors
Subsequently, in accordance with the later Defense Industries Executive Committee ruling, subcontractors were selected as follows:
Design and development including prototypes: Otokar
Design assistance and transfer of technology: Hyundai Rotem
Transfer of 120 mm 55 caliber smoothbore gun production technology: Hyundai WIA
Transfer of armor package technology and performance test: Samyang Comtech (Composite Technology), Poongsan Corporation
 Main contractor, manufacturer and responsible for further developments: BMC (replaced Otokar as main contractor)
 Engine subcontractor: Hyundai Doosan Infracore (replaced BMC Power as the first mass production engine subcontractor)
 Transmission subcontractor: SNT Dynamics (replaced BMC Power as the first mass production transmission subcontractor)
 Fire Control System, Active Protection Systems, Command Control Communication Information System, Laser Warning System, Driver's Vision System, Navigation System, IFF system subcontractor: ASELSAN
 120 mm 55 caliber smoothbore gun subcontractor: state owned MKEK (Mechanical and Chemical Industries Corporation)
 Armor package subcontractor: ROKETSAN
 Approximately 200 subcontractors

Prototypes
On 29 April 2009, the Subsecretary for Defence Industries of Turkey, Murad Bayar has confirmed at the 9th IDEX International, Defense Industry Fair in Abu Dhabi, that the Turkish tank will be manufactured using only Turkish resources. He added that the research started last week and that he expected to create an authentic tank model specially designed for the needs of the Turkish Armed Forces within 3 years.

As of September 2010, with approval of the tank subsystems and software by Undersecretariat for Defense Industries, Conceptual Design Phase of the Altay project has been completed. Thus, the project advanced to Detailed Design Phase scheduled to last 30.5 months. The scope of the Detailed Design Phase is to design and integrate interfaces for the selected tank subsystems.

On 15 October 2010, Otokar signed a contract with MTU and Renk for the supply of power pack.

On 15 December 2010, Defence Industry Executive Committee decided to start the development of national power pack.

On 10 May 2011, Aselsan was contracted by the Undersecretariat for Defense Industries to design and develop two Battlefield Target Identification Device (BTID) prototypes.

On 11 May 2011, the mock-up of the Altay was introduced to the public in IDEF2011.

On 18 October 2012, the first Altay was put on trials although lacking side skirts and using a mock-up turret to simulate a real turret.

On 16 November 2012, two pre-prototype types, named Altay MTR (Mobility Test Rig) and Altay FTR (Firepower Test Rig), successfully passed initial acceptance tests, paving the way for serial production 2 years earlier than expected, with two more prototypes to be built by 2013 or 2014.

On 7 November 2016, MTR, FTR, PV1 and PV2 (Pilot Vehicle) prototypes made by Otokar were delivered to the Turkish Land Forces, and their acceptance tests were expected to finish in the last quarter of 2016 or early 2017.

In May 2019, BMC unveiled Altay's Baseline serial production model, named T1, at the IDEF Defense Exhibition.

Design

The tank will benefit both from indigenously developed systems and from technologies of the K2 Black Panther, accorded by an agreement signed with South Korea. The main armament of the tank is the 120 mm 55 caliber smoothbore gun, which was redesigned under license based on the CN08 120 mm gun of the K2 Black Panther. The thermal sleeve of the gun barrel is equipped with a gun stabilizer configured with a static muzzle reference system (SMRS).

The armor package was modified based on the K1A1 and K2's Korean Special Armor Plate (KSAP), but was redesigned for higher ballistic protection in the Altay and will include CBRN defense elements, to protect it from chemical, biological, radiological and nuclear weapons.

The first mass production tank will be powered by 1,500 hp (1,110 kW) DV27K engines and EST15K transmissions (6 forward, 3 reverse gears) designed by Hyundai Doosan Infracore and SNT Dynamics in South Korea. whereas the latter batches may powered by an BMC Power BATU V12 12 cylinder V type  engine.

While moving at high speeds, to evade ATGM attacks, sudden braking and manoeuvering at severe angles are capabilities that were taken into consideration from early developmental stages. An isolated ammunition compartment (turret bustle) is designed to protect tank crew, alongside fire and explosion suppression systems that are to activate when hit or when the tank is involved in an accident. The tank is to be equipped with sensors for the detection of contaminated air from chemical, biological and nuclear weapons. The tank also has hunter-killer engagement capability.

Experiments and variants

Prototype
Altay MTR (Mobility Test Rig) – First pre-prototype vehicle for testing the mobility of Altay, released in 2012.
Altay FTR (Firepower Test Rig) – Second pre-prototype vehicle for Altay's Firepower Test Released in 2012.
Altay PV (Pilot Vehicle) – Experimental model for demonstrating the developed technology, these vehicles were also called Pilot Vehicles and numbered PV1 through PV2. These vehicles are also the last prototypes for developing serial production variants. The vehicles were developed in 2015 and then subjected to endurance tests, developer tests, operator tests, and integrated logistics support tests until 2016.

Variant
Altay T1 – Baseline serial production variant.
Altay T2 – Improved serial production variant.
Altay T3 – Planned  variant with unmanned turret.
Altay AHT (Asimetrik Harp Tankı) – Altay AHT "urban operations tank" was showcased by Otokar at the IDEF'17 defense and aerospace show in Istanbul on May 9–12. The tank is equipped with a directional dozer blade. The tank is probably related to Altay T2.

Foreign interest
According to reports, a military envoy from Colombia was present at the 2010 press meeting hosted by the Undersecreteriat for Defense Industries of the Republic of Turkey to obtain more information about the tank.

In April 2013, officials of the Saudi Arabian Army reportedly became interested in the Altay main battle tank, and at IDEF-2013, the Azerbaijan Army expressed interest in the Altay tank.

Additionally, Otokar placed a bid for 77 Altays for a tender in Oman in August 2013. In January 2016, Turkey reported that the Altay had received interest from Pakistan and Persian Gulf countries.

Pakistan and Saudi Arabia have shown interest in procuring the Altay for their armed forces.

In March 2019, a senior Turkish politician stated an order for 100 tanks was placed by Qatar and that the first 40 of these would be delivered in the coming two years.

Sales
The Altay won the Turkish army contract, estimated at $3.5B and signed on 9 November 2018 for a batch of 250 tanks. Three more similar batches are expected.

Qatar has purchased 100 Altay tanks along with an estimated 20 T-155 Firtina SPH.

Operators

Future Operators 

 
 Turkish Land Forces – 250 ordered in first batch (T1 and T2 variants)
 
 Qatari Emiri Land Force – ≤100 ordered

See also

 List of main battle tanks by generation

References

External links

 Otokar Official Website
 Altay main battle tank (Army recognition)

Main battle tanks of Turkey
Turkish inventions
Post–Cold War main battle tanks
Altay
Military vehicles introduced in the 2010s
Tanks of Turkey
Fourth-generation main battle tanks